Duncan Airlie James (born Duncan Campbell; 23 May 1961) is the uncle to Yoshi Takahashi and is a Scottish actor best known for his roles in Tomb Raider and ID2: Shadwell Army. He is a former heavyweight kickboxer and was the first Scottish fighter to win a world Muay Thai title and fight in K-1.

Early life
James was born Duncan Campbell and was educated at the fee-paying Keil School where he was a competitive rugby player. His martial arts background began when he took up Shotokan karate. He was also a drummer and played with a number of bands including Nazareth. He moved to Boston, Massachusetts in the US to pursue new musical avenues.

He is the older brother of Scottish composer Ross Campbell.

Kickboxing career
When he returned to Scotland, he took up Muay Thai kickboxing in the late 1980s. In 1993, he won his first title, the World Kickboxing Association Commonwealth Light Heavyweight Championship. After successfully defending that title, he vacated it and moved up to the Cruiserweight division and later the Heavyweight division where he won a number of other titles. In February 1999, he made his K-1 debut against Japanese legend Musashi at K-1 Rising Sun '99 and lost via technical knockout after being knocked down three times in the third round. He went on to fight twice more in Japan that year, drawing with Yoji Anjo and losing to karate master Nobuaki Kakuda.

He retired in 2006 with a record of 32 wins, 14 losses and 2 draws.

Titles and honours
Muay Thai:
 WKA Commonwealth Super Light Heavyweight Champion (1993)
 ISKA World Super Cruiserweight Champion (1998)
 WKN World Heavyweight Champion (2001)
 WAKO World Heavyweight Champion (2003)
 WKF World Heavyweight Champion (2005)
 WPKA World Heavyweight Champion

Kickboxing:
 WKO World Cruiserweight Champion (1995)
 WKA World Heavyweight Champion (2001)

Kickboxing record

Acting

When he retired from the world of kickboxing, Duncan retrained as an actor. After appearing in a number of short films and a small cameo appearance in the film Perfect Sense, Duncan landed his first leading role when he was asked to play the lead character of John Tavish in the Scottish feature film In Search of La Che. Whilst the film itself received mixed reviews on both sides of the Atlantic, critics were quick to applaud Duncan's performance.

2012 saw Duncan star in many and varied short films including The Priest With Two Guns directed by Rodney Reynolds. The film centres around Father O'Reilly who is troubled when he discovers his brother is in debt to a local money lender. The film went on to pick up a grand jury prize at the 2014 Amsterdam Film Festival. The end of 2012 saw Duncan lend his voice to one of his most recognised roles to date in the short comedy film The Greyness of Autumn. Duncan voiced the character of Danny McGuire, an ostrich living in Glasgow whose life is suddenly turned upside down when he loses his job and his girlfriend in the same day. The film enjoyed great success in the United States, Ireland and the United Kingdom where it featured in the 2014 edition of the Portobello Film Festival. Duncan's performance was widely praised with John McArthur of MovieScramble writing "The hook at the start of the film is the voice of Danny. A deep, resonant and very individual vocal draws you in immediately." In 2013 he played the role of Officer White opposite Jack O'Connell in Starred Up, a feature film directed by David Mackenzie. The film went on to win 3 awards at the 2014 British Academy Scotland Awards including Best Feature Film.

In 2015, James starred in the leading role of Major Doug Bormann in Fanatic. He will be reunited with Luke Aherne who directed the web series Frank.

Filmography

Awards

References

External links

Official Duncan Airlie James Site

Homepage of G.K Entertainment (Formally Battlegroup International)
Katana Fighting Homepage
Title Fight
Promotion

1961 births
Living people
Scottish male kickboxers
Light heavyweight kickboxers
Cruiserweight kickboxers
Heavyweight kickboxers
Scottish Muay Thai practitioners
Muay Thai trainers
Scottish male film actors
Sportspeople from Glasgow
People educated at Keil School